The Mercedes-Benz W223 is the seventh generation of the SClass produced by Mercedes-Benz since 2020. It replaces the W222 SClass which has been produced since 2013. The W223 SClass was unveiled on 2 September 2020.

Development and launch 
The W223 S-Class is based on the second-generation Modular Rear Architecture (MRA) platform and uses a four-link front suspension and multi-link independent rear suspension.

The W223 directs heat from the engine to the wheel arches and underbody to improve airflow and has a drag coefficient of 0.22.

The models with six-cylinder inline petrol engines have a 48V electrical system to provide additional power when needed. This also provided the power for the air conditioning system and for recharging the battery. It is also used as a starter motor in lieu of a separate and dedicated starter motor.

Models

Mercedes-Benz S 680 Guard 4MATIC 

On 28 July 2021, Mercedes-Benz announced the new armoured S 680 Guard 4MATIC. The S 680 Guard 4MATIC has VPAM V10 armour level, the highest level of ballistic protection for a civilian vehicle.

Mercedes-Maybach 
The Z223 Mercedes-Maybach S-Class was revealed on 19 November 2020 with model designations S 580 4MATIC and S 680 4MATIC. The Mercedes-Maybach is 18 centimetres longer than the predecessor. Several design cues, separating the Mercedes-Maybach from Mercedes-Benz, are carried over. Another first for Mercedes-Benz is the frontal airbags for the rear passengers.

Available engines are a 4.0-litre biturbo V8 for the S 580 4MATIC and a 6.0-litre biturbo V12 for the S 680 4MATIC. Both are fitted with standard 4MATIC all-wheel-drive system. The rear-wheel-steering system for reducing the turning radius is optional extra cost. A third engine option was released for certain markets, which is the 3.0-litre petrol six-cylinder inline engine with E-Boost. The S 480 4MATIC is released for the chinese market due to the high displacement tax imposed in that country.

In Germany Mercedes-Maybach announced the launch date of May 2021 for ordering and the delivery date of July 2021.

Mercedes-Benz launched the S 580 and the S 680 in India on 3 March 2022. The S 580 is assembled at Mercedes-Benz's plant in Chakan, Pune.

Mercedes-Maybach S580e
The Mercedes-Maybach S580e debuted in February 2023 as the brand's first plug-in hybrid model, featuring an inline-six engine and an electric motor that produce a combined  output.

Mercedes-AMG S 63 E Performance 
In December 2022, Mercedes introduced the Mercedes-AMG S63 E Performance, the high performance version of the S Class. It uses a plug-in hybrid drivetrain powered by a 4.0-liter twin-turbo V8, electric motor, and 13.1-kWh battery pack. The car produces 791 horsepower and accelerates from zero to sixty miles per hour in a claimed 3.2 seconds.

Mercedes-Maybach S680 Haute Voiture 

The Mercedes-Maybach S680 Haute Voiture is a special edition of the S680 that is based on high fashion. It was presented in May 2022 in concept form, with Mercedes later confirming intentions to put the Haute Voiture into production, with the production version being unveiled in December following a Dubai fashion show. 

The car features a two-tone paint job consisting of Nautical Blue and Rose Gold above and below the belt line, respectively. This color is exclusive to the Haute Voiture. It sports monoblock wheels painted to match the blue paint on the upper body. The body is also adorned with chrome trim.

On the interior, the car is upholstered in Bouclé, a type of fabric woven from yarn, that incorporates blue, beige, rose gold, and various other shades of gold into the pattern, with additional crystal and glossy opal white features. The car comes with a set of linen and mohair (yarn made from goat hair) floor mats, as well as a set of rose gold champagne flutes. 

The MBUX system was upgraded with the intention to emphasize the atmosphere of a fashion show catwalk, with sparkling glitter clouds and a variety of rose gold accents. Drivers are greeted with sparkling particles and a magnolia blossom on the profile selection menu, and available are 12 different elegantly dressed avatars, such as in a tailcoat, evening gown, and dinner jacket, and are adorned with fine accessories. 

The Haute Voiture will be accompanied by a special hand-made gift box containing a key ring, its badge number, and a scale model. Mercedes will also be releasing a bag collection, made of materials of the vehicle's interior, to be available in different sizes and styles. The bag collection will be released in early 2023 in limited run and will be available at both Maybach Icons of Luxury physical and online stores.

The Mercedes-Maybach S680 Haute Voiture will launch in early 2023, and is strictly limited to 150 units.

Equipment 
The W223 uses the second-generation Mercedes Benz User Experience (MBUX) infotainment system. It features a 12.3-inch instrument cluster and a 12.8-inch OLED centre infotainment system with haptic feedback. The MBUX system features over-the-air software update support, automatic driver profile selection via voice or fingerprint recognition, and a virtual assistant which activates by saying "Hey Mercedes". The assistant can be controlled by the rear seat passengers and can also control smart home appliances. The car can automatically close the windows and sunroof and recirculate air as it approaches a tunnel or detects poor air quality. Interior cameras can detect driver movements as to automatically lower the rear sunblinds if the driver looks back or switch on the interior light if the driver reaches towards the glovebox. The cameras can detect if a child seat has been installed but the seat belt has not been buckled. The car features 22 cameras and radar sensors for the adaptive cruise control, automatic steering, lane departure warning, emergency braking, and traffic sign recognition. A SAE Level 3 semi-autonomous driving system will be available in Germany from the second half of 2021.

Optional equipment includes rear-axle steering, rear-seat airbags, and a head-up-display with augmented reality for navigation directions. The headlights can project symbols on the road to warn the driver of incoming obstacles, such as roadworks, pedestrians, and traffic lights or warning signs.

For the first time in a Mercedes-Benz vehicle, the S-Class has two different types of external door handles. The standard equipment is the grip handles as found in existing Mercedes-Benz vehicles while the optional extra cost equipment is the flush-fitted handles that pop outward electrically when the Keyless Go remote fob is in close proximity.

Technical data

Engines 

The engines are carried over from previous generation of S-Class (W222) with two petrol and diesel six-cylinder inline engines at launch. Mercedes-Benz launched the models with V8 and V12 engines in May 2021. A first for a Mercedes-Benz passenger car, the V12 is fitted with the 4MATIC all-wheel-drive system. No further detail about four-cylinder inline diesel engine (previously fitted to W221 S 250 CDI/S 300 CDI and W222 S 300 BlueTec Hybrid/S 300 h), diesel hybrid engine, and high performance Mercedes-AMG engines is given (as of July 2021).

Transmission 
At launch, all models are fitted with the nine-speed 9G-Tronic automatic transmission. The new AMG S 63 E Performance is also fitted with an additional 2-speed transmission specifically for the electric motor.

Dimensions 
Standard and Long wheel base Mercedes S-Class are both available in most markets without "L" letter badge to differentiate. In American, Turkish, Russian and a few more markets, only long wheel base models are sold. In Chinese market, only long wheel base models are sold and all come with "L" letter badge.

See also
 Mercedes-Benz EQS

References

External links 

 Official site

S-Class
W223
Cars introduced in 2020
2020s cars
Vehicles with four-wheel steering